Ramón Rodríguez da Silva (born 22 August 1990), known as Ramón, is a Brazilian professional footballer who plays as a centre back.

AS Trenčín
Ramón joined AS Trenčín in winter 2012, but only signed a contract with the Corgoň Liga club in the summer of 2012. He made his debut for Trenčín against Nitra on 14 July 2012, when he played the entire 90 minutes in a 5–0 win at na Sihoti.

Career statistics

References

External links

1990 births
Living people
Sportspeople from Bahia
Association football defenders
Brazilian footballers
Brazilian expatriate footballers
Esporte Clube Bahia players
AZ Alkmaar players
AS Trenčín players
FC Nordsjælland players
SønderjyskE Fodbold players
FC Wacker Innsbruck (2002) players
MŠK Púchov players
Slovak Super Liga players
Danish Superliga players
2. Liga (Slovakia) players
Expatriate footballers in the Netherlands
Expatriate footballers in Slovakia
Expatriate men's footballers in Denmark
Expatriate footballers in Austria
Brazilian expatriate sportspeople in the Netherlands
Brazilian expatriate sportspeople in Slovakia
Brazilian expatriate sportspeople in Denmark
Brazilian expatriate sportspeople in Austria